By the arrangements of the Canadian federation, Canada's monarchy operates in New Brunswick as the core of the province's Westminster-style parliamentary democracy. As such,  the Crown within New Brunswick's jurisdiction is referred to as the Crown in Right of New Brunswick, His Majesty in Right of New Brunswick, or the King in Right of New Brunswick. The Constitution Act, 1867, however, leaves many royal duties in the province specifically assigned to the sovereign's viceroy, the lieutenant governor of New Brunswick, whose direct participation in governance is limited by the conventional stipulations of constitutional monarchy.

Constitutional role

The role of the Crown is both legal and practical; it functions in New Brunswick in the same way it does in all of Canada's other provinces, being the centre of a constitutional construct in which the institutions of government acting under the sovereign's authority share the power of the whole. It is thus the foundation of the executive, legislative, and judicial branches of the province's government. The Canadian monarch—since 8 September 2022, King Charles III—is represented and his duties carried out by the lieutenant governor of New Brunswick, whose direct participation in governance is limited by the conventional stipulations of constitutional monarchy, with most related powers entrusted for exercise by the elected parliamentarians, the ministers of the Crown generally drawn from among them, and the judges and justices of the peace. The Crown today primarily functions as a guarantor of continuous and stable governance and a nonpartisan safeguard against the abuse of power.

This arrangement began with the 1867 British North America Act and continued an unbroken line of monarchical government extending back to the early 16th century. However, though it has a separate government headed by the King, as a province, New Brunswick is not itself a kingdom.

Government House in Fredericton is owned by the sovereign only in his capacity as King in right of New Brunswick and used as an official residence by both the lieutenant governor and the sovereign and other members of the Canadian royal family will reside there when in New Brunswick.

Royal associations

Those in the royal family perform ceremonial duties when on a tour of the province; the royal persons do not receive any personal income for their service, only the costs associated with the exercise of these obligations are funded by both the Canadian and New Brunswick Crowns in their respective councils. Monuments around New Brunswick mark some of those visits, while others honour a royal personage or event. Further, New Brunswick's monarchical status is illustrated by royal names applied to regions, communities, schools, and buildings, many of which may also have a specific history with a member or members of the royal family; New Brunswick itself is named in honour of King George III, who belonged to the House of Brunswick. Gifts are also sometimes offered from the people of New Brunswick to the royal person to mark a visit or an important milestone; for instance, Queen Elizabeth II was given in 1951 a pair of hand-woven car blankets made by the loom crofters of Gagetown and, in 1976, a quilt hand-sewn by the Havelock United Baptist Church Ladies' Auxiliary.

Associations also exist between the Crown and many private organizations within the province; these may have been founded by a royal charter, received a royal prefix, and/or been honoured with the patronage of a member of the royal family. Examples include the Royal Kennebeccasis Yacht Club, which received its royal prefix from Queen Victoria in 1898. At the various levels of education within New Brunswick, there also exist a number of scholarships and academic awards either established by or named for members of the royal family, such as the Queen Elizabeth II Scholarship, set up by the government of New Brunswick to coincide with the visit of the Queen to the province in 1959.

The main symbol of the monarchy is the sovereign himself, his image (in portrait or effigy) thus being used to signify government authority. A royal cypher or crown may also illustrate the monarchy as the locus of authority, without referring to any specific monarch. Further, though the monarch does not form a part of the constitutions of New Brunswick's honours, they do stem from the Crown as the fount of honour and, so, bear on the insignia symbols of the sovereign.

History

The modern Crown's place in New Brunswick is a result of its history in the Maritimes region before New Brunswick itself was partitioned from Nova Scotia in 1784 and named for the royal house of King George III, the House of Brunswick-Lüneburg. This administrative split became necessary due to the arrival of some 35,000 to 40,000 United Empire Loyalists, as well as about 3,500 Black Loyalists, fleeing as refugees from the violence directed against them during and after the American Revolution.

King George VI's eldest daughter, Princess Elizabeth, Duchess of Edinburgh (later Queen Elizabeth II), arrived aboard the royal train in Fredericton with her husband, the Duke of Edinburgh, on 6 November 1951, being greeted officially by the King's representative, Lieutenant Governor David Laurence MacLaren, and, unofficially, by hundreds of spectators. In the capital, the couple visited Christ Church Cathedral and the Legislative Building before travelling on, via Moncton and Sackville, to Saint John, where they met First and Second World War veterans at the Lancaster Hospital and attended a civic dinner in the capital. At the University of New Brunswick, the arrangements were informal and the couple's Royal Canadian Mounted Police security detail overzealously confiscated the camera of a forestry student who happned to end up close to the Princess; the Duke eased the situation and suggested the officers return the camera to its owner.

Only a few months later, Princess Elizabeth acceded as Queen of Canada. Services of thanksgiving were held across the province for her coronation  on 2 June 1953 and denizens rose early to catch radio broadcasts of the ceremony from London, marched in Co ronation Day parades, danced at coronation balls, and watched fireworks displays. New Brunswickers also formed part of the Canadian Coronation Contingent that travelled to the United Kingdom and took part in the coronation procession. Elizabeth made her first tour of New Brunswick as queen in 1959, arriving at Fredericton airport on 29 July; she and the Duke of Edinburgh (who, by then, also held the title of prince) were welcomed by Lieutenant Governor Joseph Leonard O'Brien and a 100-man guard of honour assembled by The Black Watch (Royal Highland Regiment) of Canada. In the capital, the couple took in harness racing and a Queen's Scout recognition ceremony and, in Moncton, visited Victoria Park. At Pointe-du-Chêne, the Queen and Duke met with the families of fishermenlost in the Escuminac hurricane. Fredericton artist Howard Berry painted a 2.44 by 1.22 metre (eight by four foot) portrait of the Queen that was hung on the porch of the Legislative Building; it contained three significant allegories: a granite boulder, symbolizing New Brunswickers' loyalty; a body of water, indicating the St. Lawrence Seaway (which Elizabeth opened that year); and a glimpse of New Brunswick scenery, which was meant as an invitation.

Fredericton was again the starting point of a provincial tour by the Queen and Prince Philip, on 15 July 1976. Lieutenant Governor Hédard Robichaud (the first Acadian to act as the Queen's representative in New Brunswick) was there for the royal couple's arrival, after which they visited the Legislative Building and City Hall. At the parliament, Chief Anthony Francis, President of the Union of New Brunswick Indians, presented a petition to the Queen, demonstrating the connection between the Canadian Crown and the Indigenous peoples of Canada.

Elizabeth and Philip stopped at the Boy Scout and Girl Guide jamboree at Woolastook Provincial Park, where they had a picnic with the approximately 3,500 scouts and guides in attendance and watched performances by the Madawaska Dancers, Les jeunes chanteurs d’Acadie, the Kiwanis Steel Band, and the St. Andrew's Pipe Band, before moving on to Kings Landing Historical Settlement. In the evening, the Queen hosted a dinner at McConnell Hall, at the University of New Brunswick, followed by a fireworks show.

In Miramichi, the following day, the Queen and Duke watched an armed forces program at CFB Chatham and attended a lunch put on by the provincial Crown-in-Council. There, Premier Richard B. Hatfield presented Elizabeth with a gift from New Brunswickers: a quilt hand-sewn by the Havelock United Baptist Church Ladies’ Auxiliary. The royal party moved on to Newcastle, where the Queen, as Sovereign of the Order of Saint John, met members of the Saint John Ambulance Brigade, and visited with employees and their families at the Burchill Laminating Plant.

The Queen journeyed to New Brunswick to celebrate the province's bicentennial in 1984. While at the Legislative Building, the Queen issued a royal warrant augmenting the province's coat of arms with its present crest, supporters, compartment, and motto.

In 2022, New Brunswick instituted a provincial Platinum Jubilee medal to mark the Queen's seventy years on the Canadian throne; the first time in Canada's history that a royal occasion was commemorated on provincial medals.

See also
 Symbols of New Brunswick
 Monarchy

References

Further information

  

New Brunswick, Monarchy in
Politics of New Brunswick